Blanche may refer to:

People
Blanche (singer), stage name of Belgian singer and songwriter Ellie Delvaux
Blanche (given name)
Blanche (surname)

Places

Australia
Blanche Harbor (South Australia), a bay on the east coast of Eyre Peninsula
Blanche Harbor, South Australia, a locality on the east coast of Eyre Peninsula
 Blanche Rock, Tasmania

Haiti
 Rivière Blanche (Artibonite), a river in Haiti
 Rivière Blanche (Ouest), a river in Haiti

United States
 Blanch, North Carolina, formerly called Blanche
 Blanche, Tennessee, census-designated place
 Lake Blanche (Minnesota)

Elsewhere
 Rivière Blanche (Martinique), a river
 Aiguille Blanche de Peuterey, a mountain near Mont Blanc
 Blanche (Guinea), an island in the Îles de Los
 Blanche Harbor, in the Solomon Islands
 Blanche River (Lake Timiskaming), in Canada

Other uses
 , various Royal Navy ships
 , an iron steamship
 Blanche (Paris Métro)
 Blanche (band), an alternative-country band
 Blanche, a 1971 French drama film by Walerian Borowczyk
 Blanche (grape), another name for the French wine grape Mondeuse Blanche

See also 
 Maison Blanche, department stores
 Blanch (disambiguation)
 Blanca (disambiguation)
 Carte blanche (disambiguation)
 Dame Blanche (disambiguation)
 La Blanche (disambiguation)
 Rivière Blanche (disambiguation)